The 2013 BRD Brașov Challenger was a professional tennis tournament, played on clay courts, that took place in Brașov, Romania from 2 to 8 September 2013. It was the 18th edition of the BRD Brașov Challenger tournament and part of the 2013 ATP Challenger Tour.

In singles, Austrian player Andreas Haider-Maurer defeated fellow Austrian Gerald Melzer. In doubles, Ukrainian Aleksandr Nedovyesov and Jaroslav Pospíšil of the Czech Republic defeated Romanian players Teodor-Dacian Crăciun and Petru-Alexandru Luncanu.

Singles main draw entrants

Seeds

 1 Rankings are as of August 26, 2013.

Other entrants
The following players received wildcards into the singles main draw:
  Patrick Ciorcilă
  Florin Mergea
  Dragoș Cristian Mîrtea
  Andrei Pătrui

The following players received entry from the qualifying draw:
  Maxim Dubarenco
  Kyle Edmund
  Mathias Bourgue
  Teodor-Dacian Crăciun

The following players received entry as a lucky loser the singles main draw:
  Oliver Golding

Champions

Singles

 Andreas Haider-Maurer def.  Gerald Melzer 6–7(9–11), 6–4, 6–2

Doubles

 Oleksandr Nedovyesov /  Jaroslav Pospíšil def.  Teodor-Dacian Crăciun /  Petru-Alexandru Luncanu 6–3, 6–1

External links

BRD Brasov Challenger
BRD Brașov Challenger
2013 in Romanian tennis
September 2013 sports events in Romania